Tasmanoplectron isolatum is a species of cricket in family Rhaphidophoridae described by A. M. Richards, and the sole member of the genus Tasmanoplectron. Its distribution is restricted to Tasman Island off the coast of Tasmania. The genus is thought to have affinities with New Zealand fauna due to its marked differences from the other Australian Rhaphidophoridae.

Sources

Rhaphidophoridae
Insects described in 1971
Orthoptera of Australia
Vulnerable fauna of Australia
Taxonomy articles created by Polbot